Maria Sergeyevna Gromova (born February 28, 1988, in Moscow) is a Russian backstroke and relay swimmer, who was selected to the national team to qualify for the 2012 Summer Olympics in London. She competed in the women's 4 × 100 m medley relay, along with her teammates Yuliya Yefimova, Irina Bespalova, and Veronika Popova. She and her team placed eighth in the heats, with a time of 3:59.57, and qualified for the finals. Although she competed only as an alternate, Gromova supported her team in the finals, but missed out of the medal podium, finishing behind Japan in fourth place.

Gromova is a sports science student at Russian State University of Physical Culture, Sport and Tourism in Moscow, and works as a coach. She is currently a member of Dynamo Moskva, being trained by Svetlana Grishina.

References

Living people
Russian female backstroke swimmers
Olympic swimmers of Russia
Swimmers at the 2012 Summer Olympics
Swimmers from Moscow
1988 births
20th-century Russian women
21st-century Russian women